The Ensemble Contrechamps is a Swiss ensemble for new music based in Geneva at the Radio Studio Ernest-Ansermet.  The group's artistic director is the Swiss percussionist and composer Serge Vuille, who took over in 2018.

The ensemble has premiered works by George Benjamin, Unsuk Chin, Hugues Dufourt, Beat Furrer, Stefano Gervasoni, Heinz Holliger, Michael Jarrell, György Kurtág, Jimmie LeBlanc, Martín Matalon, Tristan Murail, Isabel Mundry and Rebecca Saunders, amongst others.  Conductors and artists associated with the ensemble include Péter Eötvös, Stefan Asbury, Pascal Rophé, Pierre-Laurent Aimard, Michael Wendeberg, Jurjen Hempel, Clement Power, and Peter Hirsch.

The Ensemble Contrechamps is regularly invited abroad for concerts and takes part in numerous festivals such as Musica (Strasbourg), Festival d’Automne à Paris, Voix nouvelles (Royaumont), Ars Musica (Brussels), Ankara Festival, Witten Days for New Chamber Music, Salzburg Festival, Music Biennale in Venice, Wien Modern, DeSingel (Anvers), Akiyoshidai Festival (Yamaguchi, Japan), Barossa Music Festival (Adelaide), Festival International de Musique (Besançon), Märzmusik Berlin, Tage für Neue Musik (Zürich), Lucerne Festival, Festival Amadeus, Bludenzer Tage zeitgemässer Musik (Austria), New Music Week of Shanghaï, etc.

In Geneva it collaborates regularly with the Centre de Musique Electroacoustique de la Haute Ecole de Musique, the Grand Théâtre, the Museum of Art and History and the Comédie. The Ensemble Contrechamps also offers numerous educational activities for school-age public in organising workshops, commented dress-rehearsals as well as concerts for children in collaboration with the theatre company Am Stram Gram.

Discography 
 Contrechamps 30 ans | Label Contrechamps 
 Luciano Berio, Points on the Curve to Find…, Folk Songs, Sequenza VII, Laborintus II | Spotify 
 William Blank, Portrait | Spotify 
 Elliott Carter, Heinz Holliger, Portrait | Fonoteca 
 Eunho Chang, Kaleidoscope | Kairos 
 Miguel Farias, Up & Down | Kairos 
 Bryn Harrison, Time becoming | Neu records 
 Michael Jarrell, Trei II, Modifications, Eco,Trace-Ecart | Spotify 
 Matthias Pintscher, Solo and Ensemble Works | Neos 
 Deqing Wen, Portrait | Presto

References

External links
 Ensemble Contrechamps Official website

Swiss orchestras
Culture in Geneva
Musical groups established in 1977
1980 establishments in Switzerland